A papulosquamous disorder is a condition which presents with both papules and scales, or both scaly papules and plaques.

Examples include psoriasis, lichen planus, and pityriasis rosea.

See also 
 List of cutaneous conditions

References

Further reading
 
 http://www.emedicine.com/derm/index.shtml#papulosquamous

External links 

Dermatologic terminology
Papulosquamous disorders